Carmel Valley can refer to several places:

 Carmel Valley, California, an unincorporated community in Monterey County, California
 Carmel Valley Village, California, an unincorporated community in Monterey County, California
 Carmel Valley AVA, an American Viticultural Area in Monterey County, California
 the valley of the Carmel River, in Monterey County, California
 Carmel Valley, San Diego, a suburban planned community in the city of San Diego, in San Diego, California